The 1996–97 NBA season was the Hawks' 48th season in the National Basketball Association, and 29th season in Atlanta. During this season, Hawks owner Ted Turner was the then-vice chairman of Time Warner after acquiring Turner Broadcasting System. In an effort to improve their team, the Hawks strengthened their defense by signing free agent All-Star center Dikembe Mutombo. During the off-season, the team signed free agents Tyrone Corbin and Willie Burton; Corbin previously played for the Hawks during the 1994–95 season. The team also signed Eldridge Recasner and former Georgia Tech guard Jon Barry.

The Hawks struggled with a 5–6 start to the season, but soon played above .500 as the team signed three-point specialist Henry James in December, and later on released Burton to free agency in January after playing 24 games. The Hawks posted a 14–2 record in January, which included a ten-game winning streak, then later on held a 31–15 record at the All-Star break, and posted a 7-game winning streak in March. The team also won 20 consecutive home games from November 12 to February 12. The Hawks finished second in the Central Division with a 56–26 record, while posting the third best home record in the league at 36–5. The Hawks had the third best team defensive rating in the NBA.

Mutombo averaged 13.3 points, 11.6 rebounds and 3.3 blocks per game, and would capture the Defensive Player of the Year honors for the second time, as he was named to the NBA All-Defensive First Team, finishing second in the NBA in rebounding and blocked shots, while Christian Laettner had a stellar season, averaging 18.1 points and 8.8 rebounds per game. Mutombo and Laettner were both selected for the 1997 NBA All-Star Game. In addition, Steve Smith continued to lead the Hawks in scoring with 20.1 points per game, while Mookie Blaylock provided the team with 17.4 points, 5.3 rebounds, 5.9 assists, led the league with 2.7 steals per game, finished second in the league with 221 three-point field goals, and was named to the NBA All-Defensive Second Team, and Corbin contributed 9.5 points and 1.3 steals per game. Off the bench, James contributed 6.7 points per game, and second-year forward Alan Henderson averaged 6.6 points and 3.9 rebounds per game, but only played just 30 games due to a mysterious illness known as "acute viral pancreatitis". Blaylock also finished in third place in Defensive Player of the Year voting.

In the playoffs, the Hawks would be put to the test as they faced the Detroit Pistons in the Eastern Conference First Round. The Pistons took a 2–1 series lead, but the Hawks managed to win the next two games, thus winning the series in five games. However, the Hawks would provide little challenge to Michael Jordan, Scottie Pippen and the Chicago Bulls in the Eastern Conference Semi-finals, as they fell in five games to the defending and eventual NBA champions, despite winning Game 2 at the United Center, 103–95. The Bulls would go on to defeat the Utah Jazz in six games in the NBA Finals, winning their fifth championship in seven years.

It was also the Hawks' final season playing at The Omni, which was scheduled to demolition after the season, and hosted its final game in a Game 4 loss to the Bulls during the second round of the playoffs, 89–80 on May 11, 1997. Following the season, Barry signed as a free agent with the Los Angeles Lakers, while James re-signed with his former team, the Cleveland Cavaliers, and Ken Norman, who only played just 17 games this season due to a back injury, retired.

Offseason

Draft picks

Roster

Roster Notes
 Shooting guard Donnie Boyce was waived on March 4.
 Small forward Willie Burton was waived on January 7.
 Small forward Darrin Hancock played in two separate stints with the Hawks during the season. He was signed by the team after being waived by the Phoenix Suns, who acquired him from the Milwaukee Bucks. After the Hawks waived him, he signed with the San Antonio Spurs, where he would only play one game for them before being released, and re-signed by the Hawks for the remainder of the season.
 Rookie center Priest Lauderdale holds both American and Bulgarian dual citizenship.

Regular season

Season standings

z = clinched division title
y = clinched division title
x = clinched playoff spot

Record vs. opponents

Game log

|- align="center" bgcolor="#ffcccc"
| 1 || November 1 || @ Miami Heat ||L 81-94 || || Miami Arena15,133 || 0-1
|-
|- align="center" bgcolor="#ffcccc"
| 2 || November 2 || Detroit Pistons ||L 78-90 || || Omni Coliseum16,378 || 0-2
|-
|- align="center" bgcolor="#ccffcc"
| 3 || November 4 || @ Portland Trail Blazers ||W 94-76 || || Rose Garden Arena21,567 || 1-2
|-
|- align="center" bgcolor="#ccffcc"
| 4 || November 5 || @ Seattle SuperSonics ||W 117-95 || || KeyArena at Seattle Center17,072 || 2-2
|-
|- align="center" bgcolor="#ccffcc"
| 5 || November 7 || @ Sacramento Kings ||W 91-87 || || ARCO Arena17,317 || 3-2
|-
|- align="center" bgcolor="#ffcccc"
| 6 || November 10 || @ Los Angeles Lakers ||L 85-92 || || Great Western Forum16,097 || 3-3
|-
|- align="center" bgcolor="#ccffcc"
| 7 || November 12 || Cleveland Cavaliers ||W 87-83 || || Omni Coliseum || 4-3
|-
|- align="center" bgcolor="#ffcccc"
| 8 || November 13 || @ Boston Celtics ||L 85-103 || || FleetCenter13,184 || 4-4
|-
|- align="center" bgcolor="#ccffcc"
| 9 || November 15 || Miami Heat ||W 85-77 || || Omni Coliseum16,378 || 5-4
|-
|- align="center" bgcolor="#ffcccc"
| 10 || November 16 || @ Chicago Bulls ||L 69-97 || || United Center23,939 || 5-5
|-
|- align="center" bgcolor="#ffcccc"
| 11 || November 19 || @ Cleveland Cavaliers ||L 63-73 || || Gund Arena14,182 || 5-6
|-
|- align="center" bgcolor="#ccffcc"
| 12 || November 21 || @ Milwaukee Bucks ||W 73-65 || || Bradley Center14,698 || 6-6
|-
|- align="center" bgcolor="#ccffcc"
| 13 || November 23 || @ Toronto Raptors ||W 91-88 || || SkyDome16,838 || 7-6
|-
|- align="center" bgcolor="#ccffcc"
| 14 || November 26 || Vancouver Grizzlies ||W 101-80 || || Omni Coliseum || 8-6
|-
|- align="center" bgcolor="#ffcccc"
| 15 || November 27 || @ Orlando Magic ||L 75-79 || || Orlando Arena17,248 || 8-7
|-
|- align="center" bgcolor="#ccffcc"
| 16 || November 29 || Washington Bullets ||W 110-81 || || Omni Coliseum12,457 || 9-7
|-

|- align="center" bgcolor="#ccffcc"
| 17 || December 3 || Boston Celtics ||W 105-95 || || Omni Coliseum || 10-7
|-
|- align="center" bgcolor="#ffcccc"
| 18 || December 4 || @ Detroit Pistons ||L 90-100 || || The Palace of Auburn Hills14,574 || 10-8
|-
|- align="center" bgcolor="#ccffcc"
| 19 || December 7 || Toronto Raptors ||W 101-75 || || Omni Coliseum11,422 || 11-8
|-
|- align="center" bgcolor="#ccffcc"
| 20 || December 10 || Denver Nuggets ||W 89-88 || || Omni Coliseum || 12-8
|-
|- align="center" bgcolor="#ccffcc"
| 21 || December 14 || Philadelphia 76ers ||W 106-81 || || Omni Coliseum12,473 || 13-8
|-
|- align="center" bgcolor="#ccffcc"
| 22 || December 17 || @ Dallas Mavericks ||W 109-73 || || Reunion Arena14,805 || 14-8
|-
|- align="center" bgcolor="#ccffcc"
| 23 || December 20 || New Jersey Nets ||W 109-95 || || Omni Coliseum12,884 || 15-8
|-
|- align="center" bgcolor="#ffcccc"
| 24 || December 21 || @ Charlotte Hornets ||L 93-98 || || Charlotte Coliseum24,042 || 15-9
|-
|- align="center" bgcolor="#ffcccc"
| 25 || December 23 || @ New York Knicks ||L 76-82 || || Madison Square Garden19,763 || 15-10
|-
|- align="center" bgcolor="#ccffcc"
| 26 || December 26 || Chicago Bulls ||W 108-103 || || Omni Coliseum16,378 || 16-10
|-
|- align="center" bgcolor="#ffcccc"
| 27 || December 28 || @ Washington Bullets ||L 86-97 || || US Airways Arena11,797 || 16-11
|-

|- align="center" bgcolor="#ccffcc"
| 28 || January 3 || @ New Jersey Nets ||W 95-85 || || Continental Airlines Arena14,310 || 17-11
|-
|- align="center" bgcolor="#ccffcc"
| 29 || January 4 || New York Knicks ||W 88-71 || || Omni Coliseum16,378 || 18-11
|-
|- align="center" bgcolor="#ccffcc"
| 30 || January 7 || Phoenix Suns ||W 105-103 (OT) || || Omni Coliseum || 19-11
|-
|- align="center" bgcolor="#ccffcc"
| 31 || January 9 || @ Orlando Magic ||W 97-92 (OT) || || Orlando Arena17,248 || 20-11
|-
|- align="center" bgcolor="#ccffcc"
| 32 || January 11 || San Antonio Spurs ||W 87-82 (OT) || || Omni Coliseum15,877 || 21-11
|-
|- align="center" bgcolor="#ccffcc"
| 33 || January 13 || @ Cleveland Cavaliers ||W 93-79 || || Gund Arena14,565 || 22-11
|-
|- align="center" bgcolor="#ccffcc"
| 34 || January 14 || Minnesota Timberwolves ||W 95-93 || || Omni Coliseum14,032 || 23-11
|-
|- align="center" bgcolor="#ccffcc"
| 35 || January 16 || Orlando Magic ||W 78-67 || || Omni Coliseum16,378 || 24-11
|-
|- align="center" bgcolor="#ccffcc"
| 36 || January 18 || Milwaukee Bucks ||W 94-71 || || Omni Coliseum16,378 || 25-11
|-
|- align="center" bgcolor="#ccffcc"
| 37 || January 20 || Charlotte Hornets ||W 106-97 || || Omni Coliseum16,378 || 26-11
|-
|- align="center" bgcolor="#ffcccc"
| 38 || January 21 || @ Miami Heat ||L 91-94 || || Miami Arena14,853 || 26-12
|-
|- align="center" bgcolor="#ccffcc"
| 39 || January 24 || Washington Bullets ||W 117-105 (OT) || || Omni Coliseum15,325 || 27-12
|-
|- align="center" bgcolor="#ccffcc"
| 40 || January 25 || Boston Celtics ||W 95-90 || || Omni Coliseum16,378 || 28-12
|-
|- align="center" bgcolor="#ccffcc"
| 41 || January 28 || @ Los Angeles Clippers ||W 112-96 || || Los Angeles Memorial Sports Arena || 29-12
|-
|- align="center" bgcolor="#ffcccc"
| 42 || January 30 || @ Utah Jazz ||L 96-102 || || Delta Center19,911 || 29-13
|-
|- align="center" bgcolor="#ccffcc"
| 43 || January 31 || @ Vancouver Grizzlies ||W 87-76 || || General Motors Place15,205 || 30-13
|-

|- align="center" bgcolor="#ffcccc"
| 44 || February 2 || @ Denver Nuggets ||L 104-115 || || McNichols Sports Arena13,122 || 30-14
|-
|- align="center" bgcolor="#ccffcc"
| 45 || February 4 || @ Golden State Warriors ||W 107-85 || || San Jose Arena13,111 || 31-14
|-
|- align="center" bgcolor="#ffcccc"
| 46 || February 5 || @ Phoenix Suns ||L 81-99 || || America West Arena19,023 || 31-15
|-
|- align="center" bgcolor="#ccffcc"
| 47 || February 12 || Toronto Raptors ||W 106-84 || || Omni Coliseum13,846 || 32-15
|-
|- align="center" bgcolor="#ffcccc"
| 48 || February 14 || Chicago Bulls ||L 88-89 || || Omni Coliseum16,378 || 32-16
|-
|- align="center" bgcolor="#ccffcc"
| 49 || February 15 || @ San Antonio Spurs ||W 109-89 || || Alamodome26,809 || 33-16
|-
|- align="center" bgcolor="#ffcccc"
| 50 || February 17 || @ Houston Rockets ||L 98-127 || || The Summit16,285 || 33-17
|-
|- align="center" bgcolor="#ccffcc"
| 51 || February 19 || Indiana Pacers ||W 100-87 || || Omni Coliseum16,378 || 34-17
|-
|- align="center" bgcolor="#ccffcc"
| 52 || February 21 || Houston Rockets ||W 76-74 || || Omni Coliseum16,378 || 35-17
|-
|- align="center" bgcolor="#ffcccc"
| 53 || February 22 || Charlotte Hornets ||L 92-93 || || Omni Coliseum16,378 || 35-18
|-
|- align="center" bgcolor="#ccffcc"
| 54 || February 24 || Golden State Warriors ||W 106-100 || || Omni Coliseum15,660 || 36-18
|-
|- align="center" bgcolor="#ccffcc"
| 55 || February 26 || @ Milwaukee Bucks ||W 79-72 || || Bradley Center13,285 || 37-18
|-
|- align="center" bgcolor="#ccffcc"
| 56 || February 28 || Los Angeles Lakers ||W 86-75 || || Omni Coliseum16,378 || 38-18
|-

|- align="center" bgcolor="#ffcccc"
| 57 || March 2 || @ Detroit Pistons ||L 75-82 || || The Palace of Auburn Hills21,454 || 38-19
|-
|- align="center" bgcolor="#ccffcc"
| 58 || March 4 || Cleveland Cavaliers ||W 93-88 || || Omni Coliseum15,404 || 39-19
|-
|- align="center" bgcolor="#ccffcc"
| 59 || March 6 || @ Philadelphia 76ers ||W 117-104 || || CoreStates Center13,802 || 40-19
|-
|- align="center" bgcolor="#ccffcc"
| 60 || March 7 || Milwaukee Bucks ||W 90-80 || || Omni Coliseum14,906 || 41-19
|-
|- align="center" bgcolor="#ccffcc"
| 61 || March 9 || @ Boston Celtics ||W 114-90 || || FleetCenter16,931 || 42-19
|-
|- align="center" bgcolor="#ccffcc"
| 62 || March 11 || Utah Jazz ||W 106-99 || || Omni Coliseum14,475 || 43-19
|-
|- align="center" bgcolor="#ffcccc"
| 63 || March 12 || @ Indiana Pacers ||L 82-92 || || Market Square Arena14,824 || 43-20
|-
|- align="center" bgcolor="#ffcccc"
| 64 || March 14 || Seattle SuperSonics ||L 91-97 || || Omni Coliseum16,378 || 43-21
|-
|- align="center" bgcolor="#ffcccc"
| 65 || March 15 || @ Chicago Bulls ||L 79-99 || || United Center23,984 || 43-22
|-
|- align="center" bgcolor="#ccffcc"
| 66 || March 17 || Orlando Magic ||W 112-107 (OT) || || Omni Coliseum15,708 || 44-22
|-
|- align="center" bgcolor="#ccffcc"
| 67 || March 19 || Indiana Pacers ||W 107-95 || || Omni Coliseum14,099 || 45-22
|-
|- align="center" bgcolor="#ccffcc"
| 68 || March 21 || Dallas Mavericks ||W 93-72 || || Omni Coliseum13,809 || 46-22
|-
|- align="center" bgcolor="#ccffcc"
| 69 || March 23 || @ Toronto Raptors ||W 90-79 || || SkyDome18,533 || 47-22
|-
|- align="center" bgcolor="#ccffcc"
| 70 || March 25 || Portland Trail Blazers ||W 96-89 || || Omni Coliseum15,256 || 48-22
|-
|- align="center" bgcolor="#ccffcc"
| 71 || March 27 || Los Angeles Clippers ||W 103-88 || || Omni Coliseum13,876 || 49-22
|-
|- align="center" bgcolor="#ccffcc"
| 72 || March 29 || Sacramento Kings ||W 88-74 || || Omni Coliseum14,942 || 50-22
|-

|- align="center" bgcolor="#ffcccc"
| 73 || April 2 || @ Charlotte Hornets ||L 84-95 || || Charlotte Coliseum24,042 || 50-23
|-
|- align="center" bgcolor="#ccffcc"
| 74 || April 4 || Detroit Pistons ||W 103-89 || || Omni Coliseum16,378 || 51-23
|-
|- align="center" bgcolor="#ffcccc"
| 75 || April 5 || New York Knicks ||L 97-102 || || Omni Coliseum16,378 || 51-24
|-
|- align="center" bgcolor="#ccffcc"
| 76 || April 9 || @ Philadelphia 76ers ||W 116-101 || || CoreStates Center16,549 || 52-24
|-
|- align="center" bgcolor="#ccffcc"
| 77 || April 11 || @ Indiana Pacers ||W 104-92 || || Market Square Arena16,403 || 53-24
|-
|- align="center" bgcolor="#ccffcc"
| 78 || April 12 || @ Minnesota Timberwolves ||W 80-66 || || Target Center18,874 || 54-24
|-
|- align="center" bgcolor="#ccffcc"
| 79 || April 15 || New Jersey Nets ||W 109-101 || || Omni Coliseum14,458 || 55-24
|-
|- align="center" bgcolor="#ffcccc"
| 80 || April 16 || @ New York Knicks ||L 92-96 || || Madison Square Garden19,763 || 55-25
|-
|- align="center" bgcolor="#ccffcc"
| 81 || April 19 || Philadelphia 76ers ||W 136-104 || || Omni Coliseum16,457 || 56-25
|-
|- align="center" bgcolor="#ffcccc"
| 82 || April 20 || @ New Jersey Nets ||L 92-108 || || Continental Airlines Arena18,702 || 56-26
|-

Playoffs

|- align="center" bgcolor="#ccffcc"
| 1
| April 25
| Detroit
| W 89–75
| Dikembe Mutombo (26)
| Dikembe Mutombo (15)
| Christian Laettner (4)
| Omni Coliseum15,795
| 1–0
|- align="center" bgcolor="#ffcccc"
| 2
| April 27
| Detroit
| L 80–93
| Steve Smith (22)
| Mookie Blaylock (9)
| Mookie Blaylock (7)
| Omni Coliseum16,378
| 1–1
|- align="center" bgcolor="#ffcccc"
| 3
| April 29
| @ Detroit
| L 91–99
| Christian Laettner (25)
| Dikembe Mutombo (21)
| Mookie Blaylock (10)
| The Palace of Auburn Hills20,059
| 1–2
|- align="center" bgcolor="#ccffcc"
| 4
| May 2
| @ Detroit
| W 94–82
| Steve Smith (28)
| Mutombo, Laettner (12)
| Mookie Blaylock (9)
| The Palace of Auburn Hills21,454
| 2–2
|- align="center" bgcolor="#ccffcc"
| 5
| May 4
| Detroit
| W 84–79
| Christian Laettner (23)
| Mutombo, Blaylock (9)
| Blaylock, Corbin (5)
| Omni Coliseum16,378
| 3–2
|-

|- align="center" bgcolor="#ffcccc"
| 1
| May 6
| @ Chicago
| L 97–100
| Mookie Blaylock (31)
| Mookie Blaylock (12)
| Christian Laettner (6)
| United Center24,397
| 0–1
|- align="center" bgcolor="#ccffcc"
| 2
| May 8
| @ Chicago
| W 103–95
| Steve Smith (27)
| Dikembe Mutombo (15)
| Mookie Blaylock (9)
| United Center24,544
| 1–1
|- align="center" bgcolor="#ffcccc"
| 3
| May 10
| Chicago
| L 80–100
| Dikembe Mutombo (16)
| Dikembe Mutombo (13)
| Mookie Blaylock (6)
| Omni Coliseum16,378
| 1–2
|- align="center" bgcolor="#ffcccc"
| 4
| May 11
| Chicago
| L 80–89
| Christian Laettner (21)
| Christian Laettner (12)
| Mookie Blaylock (4)
| Omni Coliseum16,378
| 1–3
|- align="center" bgcolor="#ffcccc"
| 5
| May 13
| @ Chicago
| L 92–107
| Christian Laettner (23)
| Dikembe Mutombo (12)
| Mookie Blaylock (8)
| United Center24,544
| 1–4
|-

Player statistics

Season

Playoffs

Awards and records

Awards
Dikembe Mutombo, NBA Defensive Player of the Year Award
Dikembe Mutombo, NBA All-Defensive First Team
Mookie Blaylock, NBA All-Defensive Second Team

Records

Transactions

Trades
July 15, 1996
Traded Stacey Augmon, and Grant Long to the Detroit Pistons for a 1997 second round draft pick, a 1999 first round draft pick, and a 1999 second round draft pick.

Free agents
July 15, 1996
 Signed Dikembe Mutombo as a free agent.

August 13, 1996
Signed Jon Barry as a free agent.

September 12, 1996
Signed Willie Burton as a free agent.
Signed Tyrone Corbin as a free agent.

September 27, 1996
Signed Eldridge Recasner as a free agent.

October 2, 1996
Signed Ivano Newbill as a free agent.
Signed Melvin Booker as a free agent.

October 28, 1996
Waived Willie Burton.
Waived Melvin Booker.

November 13, 1996
Signed Derrick Alston as a free agent.

November 14, 1996
Signed Willie Burton as a free agent.
Signed Anthony Miller as a free agent.

November 26, 1996
Waived Derrick Alston.

December 20, 1996
Signed Henry James as a free agent.

January 2, 1997
Signed Darrin Hancock as a free agent.

January 7, 1997
Waived Darrin Hancock.
Waived Willie Burton.

March 4, 1997
Waived Donnie Boyce.

March 5, 1997
Signed Darrin Hancock to the first of two 10-day contracts.

March 25, 1997
Signed Darrin Hancock to a contract for the rest of the season.

Additions

Subtractions

Player Transactions Citation:

See also
1996–97 NBA season

References

Atlanta Hawks seasons
Atlanta Haw
Atlanta Haw
Atlanta Hawks